Jaja Kalan is a village in Jalandhar district of Punjab State, India. The village is administrated by Sarpanch, an elected representative of the village.

Demography 
According to the report published by Census India in 2011 , Jaja Kalan has 214 houses and population of 979, 495 males and 484 females. Literacy rate of Jaja Kalan is 84.41%, higher than state average of 75.84%. The population of children under the age of 6 years is 94, which is 9.60% of total population of Jaja Kalan, and child sex ratio is approximately 649, lower than state average of 846.

Most of the people are from Schedule Caste which constitutes 46.68% of total population in Jaja Kalan. The town does not have any Schedule Tribe population.

As per census 2011, 326 people were engaged in work activities, 298 males and 28 females. 73.01% workers describe their work as main work and 26.99% workers are involved in marginal activity providing livelihood for less than six months.

Transport 
Goraya railway station is the nearest train station.

References 

Villages in Jalandhar district